Chila or Cheela may refer to:

Places
 Chila, Angola
 Chila (municipality), Puebla, Mexico
 Chila de la Sal, Puebla, Mexico
 Chila mountain range, in the Arequipa Region in the Andes of Peru
 Chila (Castilla), the tallest mountain in the Chila range
 Chila (Castilla-Caylloma), another mountain in the Chila range

Other uses
 Cheela (pancake), Indian pancake
 Cheela, fictional species
 Hugo Chila (born 1987), Ecuadorian athlete

See also 
Chela (disambiguation)
Chilla (disambiguation)
Shila (disambiguation)